Rev Robert Scott Mylne FRSE FSSA FSA BCL (2 April 1854 – 23 November 1920) was an English vicar, antiquarian and historical author.

Life

He was born on 2 April 1854 the son of Robert William Mylne (died 1890) and his wife, Hannah Scott.

He was rector of Furtho in Northamptonshire then of Great Amwell.

In 1902 he was elected a Fellow of the Royal Society of Edinburgh. His proposers were Sir Arthur Mitchell, Sir Archibald Geikie, George Chrystal and Alexander Crum Brown.

He died on 23 November 1920 at Great Amwell in Hertfordshire. He is buried in the churchyard of St John the Baptist in a vault designed for his family by his ancestor, Robert Mylne.

Publications

The Master Masons to the Crown of Scotland and Their Work (1893) – chosen as one of the "books of the week" by The Times shortly after its publication
The Cathedral Church of Bayeux (1904)
The True Ground of Faith
The Canon Law
The Deep Waters of Blue Galilee (poem)

References

1854 births
1920 deaths
English antiquarians
Fellows of the Royal Society of Edinburgh
19th-century English Anglican priests
19th-century English writers
20th-century English writers
20th-century English Anglican priests